
Gmina Zgierz is a rural gmina (administrative district) in Zgierz County, Łódź Voivodeship, in central Poland. Its seat is the town of Zgierz, although the town is not part of the territory of the gmina.

The gmina contains part of the protected area called Łódź Hills Landscape Park.

Villages
Gmina Zgierz contains the villages and settlements of Adolfów, Astachowice, Bądków, Besiekierz Nawojowy, Besiekierz Rudny, Biała, Ciosny, Ciosny-Kolonia, Cyprianów, Czaplinek, Dąbrówka Wielka, Dąbrówka-Malice, Dąbrówka-Marianka, Dąbrówka-Sowice, Dąbrówka-Strumiany, Dębniak, Dzierżązna, Emilia, Florianów, Gieczno, Glinnik, Głowa, Grabiszew, Grotniki, Janów, Jasionka, Jedlicze A, Jedlicze B, Jeżewo, Józefów, Kania Góra, Kębliny, Kotowice, Krzemień, Kwilno, Leonardów, Leonów, Lorenki, Lućmierz, Lućmierz-Las, Maciejów, Marcjanka, Michałów, Moszczenica, Nowe Łagiewniki, Osmolin, Ostrów, Palestyna, Podole, Rogóźno, Rosanów, Rozalinów, Samotnik, Siedlisko, Skotniki, Śladków Górny, Słowik, Smardzew, Stare Brachowice, Stare Łagiewniki, Stefanów, Swoboda, Szczawin, Szczawin Kościelny, Szczawin Mały, Szczawin-Kolonia, Ukraina, Ustronie, Warszyce, Wiktorów, Władysławów, Wola Branicka, Wola Branicka-Kolonia, Wola Rogozińska, Wołyń, Wypychów and Zimna Woda.

Neighbouring gminas
Gmina Zgierz is bordered by the towns of Łódź and Ozorków, and by the gminas of Aleksandrów Łódzki, Głowno, Ozorków, Parzęczew, Piątek and Stryków.

References
Central Statistical Office: Area and Population in the Territorial Profile in 2008

Zgierz
Zgierz County